Rattlebox is a common name for several plants which have inflated fruits in which the seeds may rattle:

Crotalaria
Sesbania
Rhinanthus

See also
Rattlebush
Rattlepod
Rattleweed